In mathematics, the vector flow refers to a set of closely related concepts of the flow determined by a vector field. These appear in a number of different contexts, including differential topology, Riemannian geometry and Lie group theory.  These related concepts are explored in a spectrum of articles:

exponential map (Riemannian geometry)
matrix exponential
exponential function
infinitesimal generator (→ Lie group)
integral curve (→ vector field)
one-parameter subgroup
flow (geometry)
geodesic flow 
Hamiltonian flow
Ricci flow
Anosov flow
injectivity radius (→ glossary)

Vector flow in differential topology

Relevant concepts: (flow, infinitesimal generator, integral curve, complete vector field)

Let V be a smooth vector field on a smooth manifold M. There is a unique maximal flow D → M whose infinitesimal generator is V. Here D ⊆ R × M is the flow domain. For each p ∈ M the map Dp → M is the unique maximal integral curve of V starting at p.

A global flow is one whose flow domain is all of R × M. Global flows define smooth actions of R on M. A vector field is complete if it generates a global flow. Every smooth vector field on a compact manifold without boundary is complete.

Vector flow in Riemannian geometry

Relevant concepts: (geodesic, exponential map, injectivity radius)

The exponential map
exp :  TpM → M
is defined as exp(X) = γ(1) where γ : I → M is the unique geodesic passing through p at 0 and whose tangent vector at 0 is X. Here I is the maximal open interval of R for which the geodesic is defined.

Let M be a pseudo-Riemannian manifold (or any manifold with an affine connection) and let p be a point in M. Then for every V in TpM there exists a unique geodesic γ : I → M for which γ(0) = p and  Let Dp be the subset of TpM for which 1 lies in I.

Vector flow in Lie group theory

Relevant concepts: (exponential map, infinitesimal generator, one-parameter group)

Every left-invariant vector field on a Lie group is complete. The integral curve starting at the identity is a one-parameter subgroup of G. There are one-to-one correspondences
{one-parameter subgroups of G} ⇔ {left-invariant vector fields on G} ⇔ g = TeG.

Let G be a Lie group and g its Lie algebra. The exponential map is a map exp : g → G given by exp(X) = γ(1) where γ is the integral curve starting at the identity in G generated by X.
The exponential map is smooth.
For a fixed X, the map t  exp(tX) is the one-parameter subgroup of G generated by X.
The exponential map restricts to a diffeomorphism from some neighborhood of 0 in g to a neighborhood of e in G.
The image of the exponential map always lies in the connected component of the identity in G.

See also 

 

Geodesic (mathematics)
Differential topology
Lie groups